The King David Kalakaua Building in Honolulu, Hawaii is a government building formerly known as the U.S. Post Office, Customhouse, and Courthouse.  It was the official seat of administration in the Territory of Hawaii and state of Hawaii for the United States federal government.

Federal building
The building was designed in 1918 and built from 1921 to 1922 in Mission/Spanish Revival architecture. An addition to the building was started in 1929, and opened in 1931.
Among other functions, the building held courtrooms and offices for the United States District Court for the District of Hawaii.

It was listed on the National Register of Historic Places (NRHP) on January 27, 1975, under the former name as site 75000620.  In 1978 it was also included as a contributing property in the NRHP listing of the Hawaii Capital Historic District.

State building
In December 2003, the federal government sold most of the building to the state of Hawaii for US$32.5 million, upon which the building was renamed in honor of King David Kalākaua — last king of the Hawaiian monarchy.  All federal agencies and departments moved their offices years earlier to the Prince Kuhio Federal Building near Honolulu Harbor, except for a small section that retains a post office.

The building holds offices of the Hawaii state Department of Commerce and Consumer Affairs. It is located at 335 Merchant Street.

See also 
List of United States post offices

References

External links 
 
 

Buildings and structures in Honolulu
Courthouses in Hawaii
Custom houses in the United States
Post office buildings in Hawaii
Government buildings completed in 1922
Government buildings on the National Register of Historic Places in Hawaii
Post office buildings on the National Register of Historic Places in Hawaii
Buildings and structures on the National Register of Historic Places in Hawaii
Historic American Buildings Survey in Hawaii
1922 establishments in Hawaii
1920s architecture in the United States
Mission Revival architecture in Hawaii
Spanish Colonial Revival architecture in Hawaii
Mediterranean Revival architecture in Hawaii
National Register of Historic Places in Honolulu
Custom houses on the National Register of Historic Places